Petre Deselnicu (23 September 1946 - 14 July 2003) was a Romanian footballer who played as a defender. He was part of "U" Craiova's team that won the 1973–74 Divizia A, which was the first trophy in the club's history.

Honours
Universitatea Craiova
Divizia A: 1973–74
Cupa României: 1976–77, runner-up 1974–75

References

External links
Petre Deselnicu at Labtof.ro

1946 births
2003 deaths
Romanian footballers
Association football defenders
Liga I players
Liga II players
CS Universitatea Craiova players
FCM Dunărea Galați players